Youth Against the Coup was a movement sprouted from the tent-filled streets of a sprawling protest camp in 2015 at Cairo’s Rabaa Al-Adawiya Square. Led by the Muslim Brotherhood, protesters gathered there for weeks to denounce the July 3 coup that ousted the Brotherhood figure, Mohamed Morsi, who governed Egypt for a year before he was unseated and ushered into detention by Egypt’s then-army chief Abdel Fattah al-Sisi.

References 

2010s in Egypt
Protests in Egypt
Political movements in the Arab world